John T. Neville (1886–1970) was an American screenwriter.

Selected filmography
 Her Mad Night (1932)
Behind Jury Doors (1932)
 Malay Nights (1932)
 Sister to Judas (1932)
 Revenge at Monte Carlo (1933)
 Alimony Madness (1933)
Her Resale Value (1933)
 Ticket to a Crime (1934)
 Rebellion (1936)
 The Lion's Den (1936)
 Battle of Greed (1937)
 Drums of Destiny (1937)
 Raw Timber (1937)
 County Fair (1937)
 My Old Kentucky Home (1938)
 Numbered Woman  (1938)
 Never Give a Sucker an Even Break (1941)
 Shake Hands with Murder (1944)

References

Bibliography
 Pitts, Michael R. Western Movies: A Guide to 5,105 Feature Films. McFarland, 2012.

External links

1886 births
1970 deaths
People from Harrisonville, Missouri
Screenwriters from Missouri
20th-century American screenwriters